Chalda is a rural locality (a selo) in Gergebilsky District, Republic of Dagestan, Russia. The population was 302 as of 2010. There are 7 streets.

Geography 
Chalda is located 16 km northwest of Gergebil (the district's administrative centre) by road, on the left bank of the Avarskoye Koysu. Mogokh and Gotsatl Bolshoy are the nearest rural localities.

References 

Rural localities in Gergebilsky District